Louis-Charles-Auguste Couder or Auguste Couder (1 April 1789, in London – 21 July 1873, in Paris) was a French painter and student of Jean-Baptiste Regnault and Jacques-Louis David. He joined the Académie des beaux-arts in 1839 and was an officer of the Légion d'honneur. He married Cornélie Stouf, daughter of the sculptor Jean-Baptiste Stouf.

Couder was buried in the cemetery of Père-Lachaise.

Famous paintings

References

1790 births
1873 deaths
19th-century French painters
French male painters
Burials at Père Lachaise Cemetery
Members of the Académie des beaux-arts
Painters from Paris
19th-century French male artists
18th-century French male artists